The 1955 Canada Cup took place June 9–12 at the Columbia Country Club in Chevy Chase, Maryland, a suburb northwest of Washington, D.C., United States. It was the third Canada Cup event, which became the World Cup in 1967. The tournament was a 72-hole stroke play team event with 25 teams; the same teams that had contested the 1954 event. Each team consisted of two players from a country. The combined score of each team determined the team results. The American team of Ed Furgol and Chick Harbert won by nine strokes over the Australian team of Kel Nagle and Peter Thomson. For the first time there was an official competition for the leading individual score. This was won by Ed Furgol, who beat Peter Thomson and Flory Van Donck in a sudden-death playoff.

Teams

The Scandinavian team consisted of a Dane, Carl Paulsen, and a Swede, Arne Werkell.

Source

Scores
Team

Source

International Trophy

Furgol, Thomson and Van Donck contested a sudden-death playoff. Van Donck dropped out after a bogey at the second extra hole. Thomson took a bogey at the third hole which gave Furgol the victory after his par. Thomson took the second prize and Van Donck the third prize.

Source

There were additional prizes of $100 each day for the lowest team and individual scores, additional prize money of $800. The team prizes were won the Australia (day 1), Ireland (day 2), the United States and Australia (day 3) and the United States (day 4). The individual prizes went to Peter Thomson (day 1), Harry Bradshaw and Flory Van Donck (day 2), Peter Thomson (day 3) and Ed Furgol (day 4).

All players received $500 in expense money.

References

World Cup (men's golf)
Golf in Maryland
Canada Cup
Canada Cup
Canada Cup